FK Spartak 1918 Varna is a Bulgarian association football phoenix club based in Varna, which currently competes in the First League, the top level of Bulgarian football league system. Spartak plays its home matches at the local Stadion Spartak.

Founded in 1918, Spartak Varna established itself as one of the early pioneering clubs in Bulgarian football. Spartak won the Bulgarian league in 1932, and was runner up in 1931 and 1933. Spartak has spent the majority of its existence in the first tier of Bulgarian football, with the club’s most recent top flight participation being season 2022–2023.

Spartak's nickname is the "Falcons", and the club has a very heated rivalry with fellow Varna-based club, Cherno More Varna. Matches between the two sides are known as the "Derby of Varna". The two sides even used to share the Yuri Gagarin Stadium before it was demolished.

History

1918–1945: Foundation of SC Sokol
Spartak Varna was founded on 28 August 1918 by a group of young people, who were playing football together for two years. At the initial meeting, regarding the establishment of the club, the name was decided to be SC Sokol. Niagol Kolev was elected as the first chairman of the club. A few days later, the members of the board registered the Football Club to the government under the name "Bulgarski Sokol". The colors of the team were blue and white. "Bulgarski Sokol," one of the poor suburban teams in Varna, is poorly circumstanced in comparison to the leading teams at that time such as Ticha and "Vladislav."  Nonetheless, the football team quickly became stronger, and improved their style of play.

On 30 January 1924 "Bulgarski Sokol" merged with the sport club "Shipka". These days the team proved itself as one of the strongest teams in Varna. Among all the players called with a lot of love from the fans "Falcons" with most successful plays was the forward Mihail Tunchev. In 1924 he was invited in the national team and that way he became the first national player of the team.

A few years later started the rise of the team. In the season 1928/29 the team won for the first time the championship of Varna, and joined the State Championship where they reached third place. Two years later 1930/31 the falcons were again champions of Varna. For the State Championship they reached the final with the Sofia's AS-23. Next year "Shipchenski Sokol" again reached the final, where the rival was the capitol's team Slavia. On 18.09.1932 in front of 10 000 audience on the football field of AS-23 the falcons won with 2:1 and became State Champion and Winner of the Cup of the King. In the next season "Shipchenski sokol" were again champion of Varna, and for the State Championship they reach for the third consecutive time the final. On 03.10.1933 in Sofia rival of the "falcons" was PFC Levski Sofia. Varna's team lost with 3:1 and took the second place in the State Championship.

1945–2010: Merge and Spartak naming
In 1945 the club merged with other two Varna's football clubs "Levski" and "Radetski". This happened on 18 October 1945, and the team accepted a new name - Spartak Varna (the name Spartak means "Spartacus", a gladiator who led an uprising against Ancient Rome). In the years between 1945–1948, three times Spartak reached the semi-finals of the State Championship. In 1950, the team took the fifth place in the newly created "A" Republican Football League. Spartak Stalin relegated to B League in 1952 but returned to A League at next year. Spartak again relegated to second level in 1963–64 season but returned in 1964–65 season. However, this return was short-lived and relegated in 1965–66.

In 1955, Spartak won the third place and bronze medals in the championship of "A" League. In 1959 the forward of Spartak Georgi Arnaudov-"Alaha" became a shooter of the championship with nine goals. Two years later, Spartak again had a winner in the shooters list: Liuben Kostov with 12 goals. In 1960/61, Spartak had very good matches in the tournament of the Soviet Army which then was playing the role of the Cup of Bulgaria. They reached the final where and meet the strongest team in Bulgaria at that time- CSKA. Spartak lost the final 3:0. As a finalist, Spartak won the right to play in the tournament of the National Cup Winners. In 1969 another sport club merged with Spartak – it was the "Lokomotiv" sport club. The merge became a fact on 06.03.1969 and the club took the name "JSK-Spartak". JSK-Spartak returned to first level in 1970–71 but relegated in 1973–74 and returned to first level in 1974–75. JSK-Spartak relegated again in 1977–78.

In 1982 the "Falcons" reached the final of the Cup of Bulgaria as they won the semi-final against Levski-Spartak in Kazanlak in front of a  crowd of 20,000. In Plovdiv, Spartak lost the final 4:0 to CSKA-Septemvriisko Zname, but as a finalist they obtained the right to play in the Cup of the National Cup Winners. In the first round, Spartak faced Turkish side Mersin Idman Yurdu. Spartak managed to win in Varna and draw in Mersin, enabling progression. In the next round, Spartak had the privilege to play former European champions Manchester United. Spartak displayed strong performances in both games, but narrowly lost 1-2 at the Yuri Gagarin Stadium and 0-1 at Old Trafford, thus suffering elimination. In the same year, JSK-Spartak returned to the A League. In the season 1983/84, after mighty and successful games, Spartak reached third place. The goalkeeper Krasimir Zafirov was declared the best goalkeeper in the championship. Since 1985 the football was separated from the other sports in JSK-Spartak, and that way the FC Spartak Varna is differentiated as well.

The 80's will be remembered and with the regular participation of the team in the tournaments for the Varna Summer Cup. Rivals of the "falcons" were the teams of NK Rijeka Croatia, the English Oxford United F.C., Hungarian Újpest FC and many others. In 1988/89, Spartak became the first Bulgarian team with private sponsor and president Atanas Atanasov-Kebie. From the autumn of 1994, president of the club was Nikolay Ishkov. Spartak relegated to B league in 1988–89 and returned to A League in 1991–92. However, Spartak relegated to second level in 1993–94.

In the season 1994/95 after mighty games the falcons won the cup as the most progressive team in Bulgaria. In the same season the forward Ivo Georgiev scores 21 goals and became shooter number one of Bulgaria. At this time Spartak was considered one of the strongest teams in Bulgaria. For the first time there was successful transfer policy and perspective selection. Many of the players has a profitable offers from capitol's and foreign clubs. In its 84 years of history Spartak went through many peaks and downfall moments, but it left a bright trace in the Bulgarian football. F.C. Spartak is one of the clubs with the greatest traditions, between the 10 clubs which have most participations in the A PFG, and between the 15 who reached the Champions title of Bulgaria. The same season Spartak returned to the first level.

2010–2015: Dark times
In May 2010, Spartak Varna was relegated to Bulgarian North East amateur division due to inability to comply with requirements for a professional license. Furthermore, under new ownership, it was founded Spartak 1918. A month later, fans of Spartak Varna (forming the majority of the ultras), not happy with the previous management and not seeing a change after the new registration, formed a new club taking over the same league FC Topolite license. However, although reaching an agreement with FC Topolite they have not been allowed to change the name of that club to Spartak. Their team has finished second after Spartak 1918 the first half of 2010/2011 season, but due to financial problems has stopped his participation. The group of fans who formed FC Topolite still boycotts the current management of Spartak 1918 and doesn't attend the team's games.

For this 2010–11 season, the club is participating in the Bulgarian North-East V AFG.

2015–present: Refounding of new Spartak

2015–2017: FC Spartak and Spartak 1918
A new team was founded on 17 May 2015 by founding board led by Spartak's legends Atanas Atanasov, Lyudmil Goranov, Dimitar Trendafilov, Ilko Stanchev and Trayan Dyankov, after the original club (named Spartak 1918 at the time) had bad leadership in the last years. The team wanted to use Spartak Stadium in order to start from the 3rd league - the Bulgarian V AFG, but this hasn't happened since the stadium was given to Spartak 1918, which withdrew from V Group and was dissolved. Some of the players who joined the team played also for the local futsal club Grand Pro Varna.

On 11 October 2015 the team signed a sponsorship with UltraGas, which would guarantee them enough money to prepare a new strong team in the future.

On 6 May 2016 team applied to gain rights to play and operate at Spartak Stadium because they can't play at Lokomotiv Stadium in V Group in 2016–17 season if they get promotion. Atanas Atanasov had a talk with the sports minister Krasen Kralev who promised to give these right to Spartak, if the stadium become municipal property, because Spartak 1918 is the current operator of the stadium, even after the condition of the stadium is critical. Atanasov also said, that the team is looking for sponsors and eventually a club owner. On 11 May 2016 the club gain the rights on Lokomotiv Stadium, which would give them the chance to start a complete youth academy from the 2016/17 season.

On 3 July 2016 Trayan Dyankov was appointed as the new manager of the team and would lead the team in Third Amateur League. On 1 August 2016 Dyankov died from a heart attack during training at Lokomotiv Stadium.  Atanas Atanasov become the manager of the team for the beginning of the season.

On 26 November 2016 the manager of Spartak, Atanas Atanasov, announced that the club will merge with Spartak 1918 to have one Spartak. On 1 February 2017 it was announced the official merge with Spartak 1918 manager,  Ivan Naydenov, taking the team. The complete merge would be after the season end.

2017–Present: Merge of Spartak teams
On 25 June 2017 FC Spartak and Spartak 1918 finally merged. Three days earlier the new logo of the team was announced. On 29 December 2017 Engibar Engibarov was announced as the new manager of the team. On 6 July 2018 Spartak returned the rights over to Spartak Stadium.

On 12 May 2019 Spartak secured their return to professional football, winning their group two rounds before its end and managing to be promoted to the Second League. However, Spartak endured a difficult season back into the second tier, finishing second to last, suffering an immediate relegation.

For the 2020-21 season, Spartak finally returned to their renovated home stadium. On 16 May 2021 the team secured their first place in their Third League group and won the promotion to Second League once again. The team ended up on top of the standings before the winter break. On 5 May 2022, after a 2:1 home win against Sozopol the team secured a top 3 place and their return to First League in the 2022–23 season, after 12 years of absence. The team missed the chance to win the last league match and ended up on 3rd place with having the same points with first and second team in group.

Honours
First League:
  Winners (1): 1932 (as Shipchenski Sokol)
  Runners-up (2): 1931, 1933 (as Shipchenski Sokol)
  Third-place (6): 1929, 1945 (as Shipchenski Sokol)  1946, 1948, 1955, 1984 (as Spartak Varna)

Second League:
  Winners (7): 1953, 1964–65, 1970–71, 1974–75, 1981–82, 1994–95, 2005–06

Third League:
  Winners (3): 2010–11, 2018–19, 2020–21

A Regional Group:
  Winners (1): 2015–16

Bulgarian Cup:
  Runners-up (2): 1961, 1983

Crest, shirt and sponsors

Spartak Varna adopted blue, white and red, the main colours of the original Spartak Varna. On 11 October 2015 the team signed a sponsorship with UltraGas. For the first match in 2018 Spartak signed a contract with the reseller store iPhonePlace.

After adopting a new logo in 2016, on 23 January 2018 Spartak managed to return the rights to their original logo.

European tournaments history

Players

First-team squad

 

For recent transfers, see Transfers summer 2022 and Transfers winter 2022–23.

Out on loan

Foreign players 
Up to five non-EU nationals can be registered and given a squad number for the first team in the Bulgarian First Professional League however only three can be used in a match day. Those non-EU nationals with European ancestry can claim citizenship from the nation their ancestors came from. If a player does not have European ancestry he can claim Bulgarian citizenship after playing in Bulgaria for 5 years. 

EU Nationals
 Rober Sierra

EU Nationals (Dual citizenship)
  Benjamin Karamoko
  Liandro Martis
  Nathan Holder
  Leroy-Jacques Mickels
  João Mário
  Cristiano
  Alexandr Belousov

Non-EU Nationals
 Luan
 Ewandro
 Romeesh Ivey
 Denys Balanyuk

Goalscoring and appearance records

Players in bold are still playing for Spartak.

Notable players
Had international caps for their respective countries, or held any club record. Players whose name is listed in bold represented their countries.

Bulgaria
 Stefan Aladzhov
 Panteley Dimitrov 
 Zdravko Dimitrov
 Diyan Donchev
 Engibar Engibarov 
 Stanislav Genchev
 Ivo Georgiev 
 Milen Georgiev 
 Plamen Getov
 Zhivko Gospodinov 
 Mihail Gyonin 
 Ivo Ivanov
 Plamen Kazakov
 Lyuben Kostov
 Iliya Kirchev
 Emil Kremenliev
 Martin Kushev
 Ivan Minchev
 Anatoli Nankov

 Stefan Naydenov
 Valentin Naydenov
 Hristo Nikolov-Choko
 Ivan Paskov
 Kiril Pandov
 Dimitar Popov
 Stoyko Sakaliev
 Nasko Sirakov
 Emil Spasov
 Valentin Stanchev
 Stefan Staykov
 Dobromir Tashkov
 Aleksandar Tsvetkov
 Georgi Tsvetkov
 Kosta Yanev
 Ivan Yordanov
 Stefan Yurukov
 Krasimir Zafirov

Europe
 Razmik Grigoryan
 Zoran Banović
 Valērijs Ivanovs
 Alexandr Belousov
 Marko Simić

North America
 Nathan Holder
 Liandro Martis

South America
 Romeesh Ivey

Africa
 João Mário
 Prosper Mendy

Personnel

Board of directors

Current technical body

Manager history

League positions

Past seasons

Spartak II

Spartak II or Spartak 2 is a Bulgarian football team based in Varna. Founded in 2021, it is the reserve team of Spartak Varna, and currently plays in Third League, the third level of Bulgarian football.

Obliged to play one level below their main side, Spartak II is ineligible for promotion to First League and also can not compete in the Bulgarian Cup.

Players

Foreign players 
Up to five non-EU nationals can be registered and given a squad number for the first team in the Bulgarian First Professional League however only three can be used in a match day. Those non-EU nationals with European ancestry can claim citizenship from the nation their ancestors came from. If a player does not have European ancestry he can claim Bulgarian citizenship after playing in Bulgaria for 5 years. 

EU Nationals

EU Nationals (Dual citizenship)
  Dakarai Truvillion
  Laur Chitanu

Non-EU Nationals
 Pavel Bachuriyski

Seasons

References

External links
Official website
bgclubs.eu

 
Association football clubs established in 1918
Spartak Varna
Phoenix clubs (association football)